HMS Nassau was a 70-gun third rate ship of the line of the English Royal Navy, launched at Portsmouth Dockyard on 2 August 1699.

Nassau was wrecked on 30 October 1706.

Notes

References

Lavery, Brian (2003) The Ship of the Line - Volume 1: The development of the battlefleet 1650-1850. Conway Maritime Press. .

Ships of the line of the Royal Navy
1690s ships